Dayana Silva (born August 17, 1990) is a Brazilian female mixed martial artist who competes in the Featherweight division of Bellator MMA. As of September 27, 2022, she is #6 in the Bellator Women's Featherweight Rankings.

Background 
Discovered in a Muay Thai social project at a public school in Rio, Dayana Silva became an MMA athlete almost by chance. After a successful debut in professional Muay Thai, she was invited at the last minute to face the already experienced Carina Damm, who at the time already had 15 MMA fights, in the renowned Bitetti Combat event, in 2009. Despite the defeat by TKO in the third round, she was sure the four-ounce glove would be her working tool from now on.

Silva was a clinical pathology technician, balancing work and training afterwards everyday, before quiting in 2015 to focus full time on MMA.

Mixed martial arts career

Early career
Going 7–3 on the Brazilian regional scene, with the other two losses besides her debut coming against future UFC fighters Juliana Lima and Jennifer Maia, Silva was invited to Dana White's Contender Series Brazil 3 on August 11, 2018 and faced Gisele Moreira. She lost the bout via split decision.

A year later after the loss, Silva faced Sidy Rocha at Shooto Brasil 95 for the vacant Shooto Brazil Bantamweight Championship. She won the bout and the title via unanimous decision.

On a month's notice, Silva competed in the one night Shooto Brasil Women's Lightweight Grand Prix on March 1, 2020, with the winner gaining a contract for the 2021 Professional Fighters League season. Silva started the event by facing Mariana Morais. In a tough fight, she lost by split decision.

At Shooto Brasil 100, Silva faced Tayná Lamounier, winning the bout via unanimous decision.

Bellator MMA
On March 10, 2021, it was announced Silva had signed a 3 bout contract with Bellator MMA.

Silva was initially expected to face former Bellator Women's Featherweight Champion Julia Budd at Bellator 256 on April 9, 2021. However, the fight was rescheduled and eventually took place on April 16, 2021 at Bellator 257. Silva lost the bout via split decision.

Silva faced Arlene Blencowe on July 16, 2021 at Bellator 262. She lost the bout via TKO in the third round.

Silva faced Janay Harding on April 23, 2022 at Bellator 279. She won the bout via unanimous decision.

Silva faced Leah McCourt on September 23, 2022 at Bellator 285. She lost the fight by unanimous decision.

Championships and accomplishments
Shooto Brazil
Shooto Brazil Bantamweight Championship (One time)

Mixed martial arts record

|-
| Loss
| align=center| 10–8
| Leah McCourt
|Decision (unanimous)
| Bellator 285
| 
|align=center| 3
|align=center| 5:00
| Dublin, Ireland
|
|-
| Win
| align=center| 10–7
| Janay Harding
|Decision (unanimous)
| Bellator 279
| 
|align=center|3
|align=center|5:00
| Honolulu, Hawaii, United States
| 
|-
| Loss
| align=center| 9–7
| Arlene Blencowe
|TKO (punches)
|Bellator 262
|
|align=center|3
|align=center|1:00
|Uncasville, Connecticut, United States
| 
|-
| Loss
| align=center| 9–6
| Julia Budd
|Decision (split)
|Bellator 257
|
|align=center|3
|align=center|5:00
|Uncasville, Connecticut, United States 
|
|-
| Win
| align=center| 9–5
| Tayná Lamounier
|Decision (unanimous)
|Shooto Brasil 100
|
| align=center| 3
| align=center| 5:00
|Rio de Janeiro, Brazil
|
|-
| Loss
| align=center| 8–5
| Mariana Morais
| Decision (split)
|Shooto Brasil: Grand Prix
|
| align=center| 3
| align=center| 5:00
|Rio de Janeiro, Brazil
| 
|-
| Win
| align=center| 8–4
| Sidy Rocha
|Decision (unanimous)
|Shooto Brasil 95
|
|align=center|3
|align=center|5:00
|Rio de Janeiro, Brazil
|
|-
| Loss
| align=center| 7–4
| Gisele Moreira
|Decision (split)
|Dana White's Contender Series Brazil 3
|
|align=center|3
|align=center|5:00
|Las Vegas, Nevada, United States
|
|-
| Win
| align=center| 7–3
| Juliete de Souza
|Decision (unanimous)
| Cruzeiro Fight 1
| 
|align=center|3
|align=center|5:00
| Rio de Janeiro, Brazil
| 
|-
| Loss
| align=center| 6–3
| Jennifer Maia
| Decision (majority)
|Imortal FC 2: Kamikaze
| 
|align=center|3
|align=center|5:00
| São José dos Pinhais, Brazil
|
|-
| Win
| align=center| 6–2
| Núbia Nascimento
|Decision (unanimous)
|Belford Fight: Super Challenge
|
| align=center| 3
| align=center| 5:00
|Belford Roxo, Brazil
|
|-
| Win
| align=center| 5–2
| Mayara Aguiar
| TKO (punches)
| Pink Fight 3
| 
| align=center|1
| align=center|2:02
| Campos dos Goytacazes, Brazil
| 
|-
| Win
| align=center| 4–2
| Weyde Ventura
| TKO (punches)
|Gladiators Extreme Fight
|
| align=center| 3
| align=center| N/A
|São João de Meriti, Brazil
|
|-
| Win
| align=center| 3–2
| Aline Nery
|Decision (unanimous)
|Gringo Super Fight 3
|
|align=center|3
|align=center|5:00
|Nova Iguaçu, Brazil
|
|-
| Loss
| align=center| 2–2
| Juliana Lima
|Decision (unanimous)
|Brasil Fight 4: The VIP Night
|
|align=center|3
|align=center|5:00
|Nova Lima, Brazil
| 
|-
| Win
| align=center| 2–1
| Roberta Torno
| Decision (unanimous)
|88 Fight Championship
|
| align=center| 3
| align=center| 5:00
|Rio de Janeiro, Brazil
|
|-
| Win
| align=center| 1–1
| Luciana Pereira
| Decision (split)
|Gringo Super Fight 2
|
| align=center| 3
| align=center| 5:00
|Nova Iguaçu, Brazil
|
|-
| Loss
| align=center| 0–1
| Carina Damm
| TKO (punches)
|Bitetti Combat 5
|
| align=center| 3
| align=center| 3:27
| Barueri, Brazil
|

See also
 List of current Bellator fighters
 List of female mixed martial artists

References

External links 
  
  

1990 births
Living people
Brazilian female mixed martial artists
Featherweight mixed martial artists
Mixed martial artists utilizing Muay Thai
Bellator female fighters
Brazilian Muay Thai practitioners
Female Muay Thai practitioners
People from Nova Iguaçu
Sportspeople from Rio de Janeiro (state)